Strike the Blood is an anime series adapted from the light novel series of the same title written by Gakuto Mikumo with illustrations by Manyako. The fifth and final OVA series, consisting of four episodes, premiered on March 30, 2022, and concluded on July 29, 2022. The ending theme is "Engagement ~Yakusoku~" performed by Risa Taneda. The OVA feature the returning cast and staff.


Episode list

References

Strike the Blood episode lists
2022 Japanese television seasons